Irvin High School is an El Paso Independent School District (EPISD) high school in El Paso, Texas, United States. It opened in September 1959. It is named for Dr. O.C. Irvin, Dr. E.H. Irvin, and Mr. C. M. Irvin. All three of these men were well-known contributors to the El Paso public schools.

History
In 1882, Dr. O. C. Irvin became the first superintendent of the El Paso City School District (the forerunner of today's El Paso Independent School District). One of his dreams was to have a good high school in El Paso. He served as president of the school board beginning in 1913. Dr. E. H. Irvin made El Paso High School a reality to help El Paso's overwhelming growth problems. Mr. C. M. Irvin was a member of the El Paso Chamber of Commerce and was the president of the school board from 1955 through April 8, 1958, when he retired.

Mr. Cecil S. Bean was Irvin's first principal, and Mr. Boyd was the first assistant principal.

Academics
Irvin High School serves the central portion of Northeast El Paso, an inner-suburb area of mainly single-family homes and apartment complexes built for the most part in the 1950s and 1960s, except for the Eisenhower-Sahara neighborhood between Dyer Street and McCombs Street which is just south of the Woodrow Bean-Transmountain Road (Texas Loop 375) and the Castner Heights neighborhood, which was built on a tract of former United States Army land bordered by Dyer Street, the Patriot Freeway (US 54), Diana Drive and Hondo Pass Avenue. These contain many newer homes built beginning in the late 1970s, and the Eisenhower-Sahara neighborhood contains a public housing development of duplexes and a fairly large mobile home subdivision for singles and retirees.

JROTC
In 1962, Irvin High School established its Junior Reserve Officer's Training Corps as the 6th JROTC Battalion as part of the 5th Brigade of Cadets.

Irvin New Tech
Irvin High School was designated a T-STEM academy  in 2012 after the Governor’s Executive Order RP53 in 2005. The first T-STEM academies opened in the 2006-2007 school year and have since then made great strides in college readiness and competitiveness of Texas high school graduates. "Rocket New Tech" is the name of the platform Irvin High School will use to launch their cohorts of students beginning in their freshman year into Irvin's T-STEM courses. From Irvin's Official website, it states, "Irvin T-STEM pathways include Engineering (Robotics, Electrical, Architecture & Green Energy), Biotechnology, Media Productions, Cyber Security and Computer Technology."

Irvin P-Tech Medical
Beginning in the 2022-2023 school year, Irvin High School, in partnership with the El Paso Community College, will offer all students the opportunity to complete their associate's degree or an EMT Certification to get on the right track after high school.  Degrees & Certifications:  Multidisciplinary Associates of Arts/EMT Certification

Attendance Zone
Is defined by Railroad Drive on the southeast;  McCombs Street on the east; the Patriot Freeway, Hondo Pass Avenue, and Mercury Street on the west; on the south, Apollo Avenue and Diana Drive east of the Patriot Freeway and Atlas Avenue west of it; and on the north, Woodrow Bean Transmountain Road east to Girl Scout Way, then Girl Scout Way north to Fairbanks Drive, then Fairbanks east to Alcan Street, then Alcan south to Woodrow Bean, then Woodrow Bean again east to McCombs. Magoffin Middle School and portions of the Canyon Hills Middle School and Terrace Hills Middle School attendance zones graduate into Irvin; the elementary schools in the Irvin feeder pattern include Crosby, Dowell, Lee, Moye, Schuster, Stanton, and Whitaker, as well as the southern edge of the Newman Elementary attendance zone (bordered by Woodrow Bean, Fairbanks, Girl Scout, and Alcan).

School Mascot and School Colors
 The Rocket was chosen as the mascot for Irvin High School because of its close affiliation with the military at nearby Fort Bliss. On that same line, the patriotic colors of Red, White, and Blue were chosen by the coaches and the school board to represent Irvin's pride.

A popular legend is that Irvin High School was made in the shape of a rocket. From an aerial view, the layout of the school does resemble one.

However, this has never been officially confirmed. On November 8, 2016, El Paso voters approved a $668.8 million bond proposal aimed at modernizing campuses within the El Paso Independent School District. Irvin High School was slated over $51 million to renovate and remodel the campus.  Exterior buildings that helped shape the image of the "Rocket" have been removed, thus the image of the beloved campus prior to the EPISD Bond is one of a few images remnant of the "rocket-shape".

Programs and activities

Notable alumni
 Billy Davis, former NFL player with the Dallas Cowboys and Baltimore Ravens - Winning a Super Bowl with each team
 Sharon Tate, Actress - victim of the Tate/Labianca murders (Charles Manson)
 Kayla Thornton, forward for the Dallas Wings
 Ed Stansbury, former UCLA football player, High School 1-5A Discus State Champion, former NFL player
 Lorenzo Mendez, Singer, Two time, Grammy Winner
 Aulsondro "Novelist" Hamilton Multi-Platinum Producer, Billboard Chart Topping Christian Hip Hop Recording Artist & Actor
 Germaine Franco, Film Composer, conductor, songwriter, arranger, record producer, and percussionist.  She is the first woman to score a Disney animated feature film with Encanto (2021), for which she was nominated for a Golden Globe, an SCL Award, an Annie Award, and an Academy Award for Best Original Score. She is the first Latina to be nominated for the latter, as well as the first to join the music branch of the Academy

References

External links

Irvin High School on education.com
 School, Irvin H. "Irvin High School." EPISD Schools. Irvin High School, n.d. Web. 16 Feb. 2013.

High schools in El Paso, Texas
Educational institutions established in 1959
El Paso Independent School District high schools
1959 establishments in Texas